Zychaspis is an extinct genus of Devonian jawless fishes. Species are from the Devonian of Ukraine.

The genus name is a tribute to palaeontologist Władysław Zych (1899 – 1981).

Z. bucovinensis is found only at Babin (Bobince), Podoli [Babin Sandstone] (Devonian of Ukraine). Z. elegans (syn. †Cephalaspis elegans Balabai, 1962) is found on the Podolian plateau.

References

External links 

 

Osteostraci genera